Physatocheila plexa is a species of lace bug in the family Tingidae.  It is found in North America.

References

Further reading

 
 
 

Tingidae
Insects described in 1832